The NWA World Historic Light Heavyweight Championship (Campeonato Mundial Historico de Peso Semicompleto de la NWA in Spanish) is a professional wrestling championship promoted by Consejo Mundial de Lucha Libre (CMLL). CMLL had held the NWA World Light Heavyweight Championship for over 48 years, when the relationship between the promotion and National Wrestling Alliance broke down in March 2010. Blue Demon Jr., the president of NWA Mexico, sent letters to CMLL, telling them to stop promoting the NWA-branded championships since they were no longer part of the NWA. On August 12, 2010, CMLL debuted the new NWA World Historic Light Heavyweight Championship belt and named El Texano Jr., the final CMLL-recognized NWA World Light Heavyweight Champion, as the inaugural champion.

The current champion is Stuka Jr., who defeated Hechicero to win the championship on August 14, 2018. This is Stuka Jr.'s first title reign; his current reign is the seventh in the title's history. All title matches take place under best two-out-of-three falls rules.

Background

The first light heavyweight division professional wrestling championship recognized in Mexico was the Mexican National Light Heavyweight Championship, created in 1942, sanctioned by the Mexico City boxing and wrestling commission and promoted by a number of different Mexican professional wrestling promotions including Empresa Mexicana de Lucha Libre (EMLL; Spanish for "Mexican Wrestling Enterprise"). In 1953, EMLL joined the National Wrestling Alliance (NWA), and in 1957 EMLL was given control of the NWA World Light Heavyweight Championship after it had been inactive for around four years. From 1957 on the championship was defended primarily in Mexico on EMLL shows and occasionally in Southern California during the 1970s.

In the late 1980s, EMLL left the NWA to avoid the politics of that organization. While they left the NWA they did retain control of the NWA World Light Heavyweight Championship as their main championship of the light heavyweight division, as well as promoting the Mexican National Light Heavyweight Championship as the secondary championship. In 1991, EMLL was renamed "Consejo Mundial de Lucha Libre" (CMLL; "World Wrestling Council") after which they began to introduce a series of "CMLL" branded world championships. On September 26, 1991, CMLL determined the first ever holder of the CMLL World Light Heavyweight Championship as Jerry Estrada defeated Pierroth Jr. in the finals of a tournament.

In 2010, the NWA, represented by NWA Mexico president Blue Demon Jr., reached out to CMLL and asked them to stop using the NWA-branded championships since they were not part of the NWA. Blue Demon Jr. was in the process of establishing NWA Mexico as a promotion and wanted to use the championship. There had been previous attempts by the NWA to gain back control of the three NWA-branded championships that CMLL used, the light heavyweight championship as well as the NWA World Welterweight Championship and the NWA World Middleweight Championship, but in those instances, CMLL had not responded to those requests at all. The promotion did not directly respond to the latest claim; the NWA Welterweight Champion, Mephisto, commented instead, simply stating that the championships belonged to CMLL. Finally, on August 12, 2010, CMLL debuted the new NWA World Historic Light Heavyweight Championship belt and named El Texano Jr., the final CMLL-recognized NWA World Light Heavyweight Champion, as the inaugural champion. The championship was initially announced as the CMLL Historic Light Heavyweight Championship, but when the belt was unveiled, it was called the "NWA World Historic Light Heavyweight Championship" (Campeonato Mundial Historico de Peso Semicompleto de la NWA in Spanish)

Reigns
Stuka Jr. is the current NWA World Historic Light Heavyweight Champion, having defeated Hechicero for the championship on August 14, 2018. He is the seventh overall champion and the fifth individual to hold the title. Rey Bucanero is the only wrestler to have won the championship on two occasions and also holds the distinction of holding the record for the longest reign as his first reign with the championship lasted 714 days in total. The first champion, El Texano Jr., held the title for the shortest reign between August and December 2010, a total of 124 days. The championship has been vacated twice, first in 2011 when then-champion Shocker suffered a knee injury and was forced to give up the championship. In early 2015, CMLL vacated the championship once more, this time because champion Diamante Azul had not appeared at CMLL shows for several months. Current champion Hechicero was the first champion to defend the championship at a non-CMLL event as he defeated Caifan on November 27, 2016 in the main event of Lucha Memes Chairo 6 in Naucalpan, State of Mexico. Of all the champions El Texano Jr. and Shocker are the only champions to never have a successful championship defense. Hechicero's 641-day reign from 2016 to 2018 saw Hechicero successfully defend the championship six times, the most of any champion.

Rules

In the 20th century CMLL were generally consistent and strict about enforcing the actual weight limits. However, in the 21st century the official definitions have at times been overlooked for certain champions. While the heavyweight championship is traditionally considered the most prestigious weight division in professional wrestling, CMLL places more emphasis on the lower weight divisions, often promoting those ahead of the CMLL World Heavyweight Championship.

Championship matches usually take place under best two-out-of-three falls rules. On occasion single fall title matches have taken place, especially when promoting CMLL title matches in Japan, conforming to the traditions of the local promotion.

Tournaments

2011

In May 2011 CMLL declared the NWA World Light Heavyweight Championship vacant when the then reigning champion Shocker had to undergo knee surgery after suffering an injury and thus would be unable to defend the championship for an undetermined amount of time. CMLL decided to hold a tournament to determine the next champion, splitting the 16 man group of competitors into two groups, each of which would compete in a torneo cibernetico elimination match to find a finalist. After the two torneo cibernetico matches the two winners would face off the following week in a one-on-one best two-out-of-three falls match. Block A of the tournament took place on June 7, 2011, and saw El Hijo del Fantasma win, while Block B took place a week later on June 14 and had Rey Bucanero as the victor. The following week, on June 21, Rey Bucanero defeated El Hijo del Fantasma to become the third ever NWA World Historic Light Heavyweight Champion. Bucanero became the first champion to have not also held the previous NWA World Light Heavyweight Championship.

Block A Cibernetico

Block B Cibernetico

2015

Due to the championship being vacated on February 23, 2015, CMLL held a tournament for the vacant light heavyweight championship starting March 1, 2015. La Sombra and Rey Bucanero outlasted Atlantis, Blue Panther, Dragón Rojo Jr., Ephesto, Misterioso Jr., Mr. Águila, Niebla Roja, Stuka Jr., Valiente and Último Guerrero in a 12-man torneo cibernetico elimination match. On March 8, Bucanero defeated La Sombra to win the tournament and the vacant championship.

2015 Torneo Cibernetico

Title history

Combined reigns

Footnotes

References

External links
Official CMLL Website

Consejo Mundial de Lucha Libre championships
Light heavyweight wrestling championships
World professional wrestling championships